Isabelle Cogitore (29 July 1964, Épinal) is a French historian, a specialist of ancient Rome, professor of Latin language and literature at the Stendhal University in Grenoble.

Bibliography 
Among her publications are:
2002: La légitimité dynastique d'Auguste à Néron à l'épreuve des conspirations, École française de Rome 
2002: Translation of the biographie de l'empereur Claude, by Barbara Levick 
2005: Translation by Paolo Fedeli, under the title Écologie antique ; milieux et modes de vie dans le monde romain
2011: Le Doux Nom de liberté, éditions Ausonius
2001: 
2003:

References

External links 
 

École Normale Supérieure alumni
21st-century French historians
French scholars of Roman history
Women classical scholars
People from Épinal
1964 births
Living people
French women historians
21st-century French women